Ali Salem Ahmed Faraj Al-Amri (born 7 1989) is a former Emirati professional footballer who played as a defender, and used to play for the United Arab Emirates national football team.

He competed at the 2012 Summer Olympics.

Honours
United Arab Emirates
 Gulf Cup of Nations: 2013

References

1988 births
Living people
Emirati footballers
Emirati expatriate footballers
Olympic footballers of the United Arab Emirates
Footballers at the 2012 Summer Olympics
UAE Pro League players
UAE First Division League players
Al Jazira Club players
Al-Nasr SC (Dubai) players
Baniyas Club players
Masafi Club players
Masfout Club players
Asian Games medalists in football
Footballers at the 2010 Asian Games
Asian Games silver medalists for the United Arab Emirates
Association football defenders
Medalists at the 2010 Asian Games
Expatriate footballers in England
Emirati expatriate sportspeople in England